The following is a list of the heaviest professional sumo wrestlers. Only wrestlers weighing  or over are included.
Wrestlers shown in bold are still active as of January 2023.

See also
List of heaviest people
List of past sumo wrestlers
List of non-Japanese sumo wrestlers
List of sumo elders
List of sumo record holders
List of sumo stables

References 
Sumo.sports.smt.docomo.ne.jp
Web-japan.org

External links
 Sumo.or.jp
 Chiebukuro.yahoo.co.jp
 theculturetrip.com

Lists of sumo wrestlers